The  is a public university in Japan. Its headquarters is in Chuo-ku, Kobe City.

History 

At its birth, UH opened a new independent campus (with its headquarters) in the Harborland (Chuo-ku, Kobe); the other campuses were those of the predecessors:
 former Kobe University of Commerce:
 Kobe Gakuentoshi Campus (in Nishi-ku, Kobe)
 former Himeji Institute of Technology:
 Himeji Shosha Campus (in Himeji, Hyogo)
 Harima Science Garden City Campus (in Kamigori-cho, Hyogo)
 Himeji Shinzaike Campus (in Himeji, Hyogo)
 former College of Nursing Art and Science, Hyogo:
 Akashi Campus (in Akashi, Hyogo)

Below are the histories of the predecessors:

Kobe University of Commerce 

Because in 1929 the older Kobe Higher Commercial School (a national college) was reorganized into older Kobe University of Commerce (for age 19-22 or above; see Kobe University), the prefecture lost a college for boys at age 17–20. So the prefecture founded its own commercial college. The campus was located on a hill called  in Tarumi. In 1944 the college was renamed . Among the notable alumni are Isao Nakauchi (the founder of Daiei) and Nobuo Okishio (who finally graduated Kobe University).

In 1948 the college was reorganized into Kobe University of Commerce, the first public university under Japan's new educational system. In 1990 KUC moved to present-day Kobe Gakuentoshi Campus.

Himeji Institute of Technology 

The first campus was located on a hill of Goinoike, Nagata-ku, Kobe. In 1945 the campus was heavily bombed; in 1946, after World War II, the college was removed to Idei, Himeji.

In 1949 the school was reorganized into Himeji Institute of Technology under Japan's new educational system. In 1957 HIT department of junior college was reorganized into Himeji College, an independent college; in 1965 the college was removed to present-day Himeji Shinzaike Campus (the former campus of Himeji Higher School, a predecessor of Kobe University). HIT moved to present-day Himeji Shosha Campus in 1970. In 1990 HIT School of Science was established, and new Harima Science Garden City Campus was opened for the school in 1991. In 1998 Himeji College was reorganized into HIT School of Human Science and Environment.

College of Nursing Art and Science, Hyogo 
CNASH was established in 1993; it was the first public 4-year college of nursing in Japan. The Graduate School was implemented by 1999 (both Master's and Doctoral programs).

Undergraduate Schools 

 in Kobe Gakuentoshi Campus:
 School of Economics
 School of Business Administration
 in Himeji Shosha Campus:
 School of Engineering
 in Harima Science Garden City Campus:
 School of Science
 in Himeji Shinzaike Campus:
 School of Human Science and Environment
 in Akashi Campus:
 College of Nursing Art and Science

Graduate Schools 

 in Kobe Campus:
 Graduate School of Simulation Studies
 Graduate School of Applied Informatics
 in Kobe Gakuentoshi Campus:
 Graduate School of Economics
 Graduate School of Business Administration
 Graduate School of Accountancy (Department of Professional Accountancy)
 in Himeji Shosha Campus:
 Graduate School of Engineering
 in Harima Science Garden City Campus:
 Graduate School of Material Science
 Graduate School of Life Science
 in Himeji Shinzaike Campus:
 Graduate School of Human Science and Environment
 in Akashi Campus:
 Graduate School of Nursing Art and Science

Institutes 
 Research Institute for Economics and Business Administration (in Kobe Gakuentoshi)
 Laboratory of Advanced Science and Technology for Industry (in Harima Science Garden City)
 Institute of Natural and Environmental Sciences
 Nature and Environment Division (in Sanda)
 Landscaping and Horticulture Division (in Awaji)
 Rural Ecology Division (in Toyooka)
 Astronomy and Astrophysics Division (in Sayo-cho)
 Research Institute of Nursing Care for People and Community (in Akashi)

Academic rankings

References

External links 
 Official Website

Public universities in Japan
Universities and colleges in Hyōgo Prefecture
Educational institutions established in 2004
Kansai Collegiate American Football League
2004 establishments in Japan
Harima Science Garden City